Engutoto is an administrative ward in the Arusha District of the Arusha Region of Tanzania. In 2016 the Tanzania National Bureau of Statistics report there were 8,287 people in the ward, from 6,970 in 2012.

References

Arusha District
Wards of Arusha Region